Saul Goodman (July 16, 1907 – January 26, 1996) was the principal timpanist of the New York Philharmonic from 1926 to 1972.

Career
Goodman was born in New York, the son of Polish Jewish emigrants, Abraham L. Goodman and Yetta Feigenbaum Goodman. He grew up in Brooklyn, and learned under the instruction of Alfred Friese. At the age of 19, Goodman succeeded Friese as principal timpanist in the New York Philharmonic. Goodman was a member of the faculties at the Conservatoire de musique du Québec à Montréal and the Juilliard School of Music where he taught many who went on to become timpanists in symphony orchestras around the world.

During his career Goodman made innovations in drum and mallet construction, including a tuning system for drums and a line of timpani mallets, which Regal Tip began manufacturing in 1979. He played the first performance of a timpani concert to be broadcast. During his years at the Philharmonic, he lived in Yonkers, NY. 

His wife was Lillian Rehberg Goodman, cellist, winner of Naumburg Competition (1931) and the president of Violoncello Society of New York (1972–1975). Goodman died in Palm Beach, Florida.

Works

Method Book 

 Modern Method for Timpani
 Modern Classic Solos for Snare Drum
 Saul Goodman Memorial Percussion Ensemble Collection

Solo 

 Introduction and Allegro (Timpani)
 Ballad for the Dance (Timpani & Suspended Cymbal)

Ensemble 

 Scherzo for Percussion For 3 Players
 Theme and Variations For 4 Players
 Proliferation Suite For 7 Players

Notable students

Elden C. “Buster” Bailey, New York Philharmonic
Everett "Vic" Firth, Boston Symphony Orchestra
William Kraft, Los Angeles Philharmonic
Leon Milo, composer, percussionist. and sound artist
Ruth Underwood, percussionist Frank Zappa's Mothers of Invention from 1967 to 1977
David Friedman Vibraphonist, Hochschule-Berlin

References

External links
 Video of Saul Goodman class at the Oberlin Percussion Institute in 1988 
 Video of Saul Goodman and other percussionists with the New York Philharmonic and Leonard Bernstein 

1907 births
1996 deaths
Academic staff of the Conservatoire de musique du Québec à Montréal
Jewish American musicians
Juilliard School faculty
Musicians from Brooklyn
People from Yonkers, New York
Timpanists
American people of Polish-Jewish descent
20th-century American drummers
American male drummers
Educators from New York City
20th-century American male musicians
20th-century American Jews